The vjesci is a vampire in Polish folklore. According to legend, a person was destined to be a vjesci from the time they were born. It was possible to point out from a caul located on the newborn's head. In order to prevent the person from becoming a vjesci, the caul was removed, dried, ground and fed to the person on their seventh birthday. Typically, the vjesci would appear to be quite normal and would blend into the community, although in some cases, it was said to have an excitable nature and a ruddy complexion.  At the time of their death, a vjesci would refuse to take the sacrament. The body would cool closely and the limbs would remain limber. The lips and cheeks would remain red and spots of blood often appeared under the fingernails and on the face.

According to legend, the vjesci didn't die, instead returning to life at midnight after burial and eating its clothes and some of his own flesh. The vampire would leave the grave and return home to eat its family and neighbors. After visiting its relatives, it would go to the local church and ring the church bell, and those who heard the bell were destined to be the vampire's next victims.

Preventing an attack
Despite the vjesci being a legend, people were taught how to protect themselves against it.

 All dying persons must receive the Eucharist.
 Soil was placed inside the coffin and underneath the body to prevent it from returning home.
 A crucifix or coin was placed under the tongue of the corpse for the vampire to suck on.
 A net would sometimes be placed inside the coffin.  The concept behind this was that the knots on the netting must be untied (one knot per year) before the vampire could rise again.
 Bodies were laid in the coffin face down so that the corpse, if it returned to life, would simply dig further into the earth.

Practices surrounding attacks 
In spite of all precautions, if a vampire had managed to rise and attack the community, its tomb had to be opened and the body laid to rest. A nail could be driven through its forehead. However, the more common practice was decapitation of the corpse after which the severed head was placed between the corpse's feet. At the time the head was severed, blood from the wound would be given to any who had fallen ill as a result of the vampire's attack, believed to cause their recovery.

Empty Night 
Empty Night (Pustô noc) is the Kashubian name for the ritual that takes place on the last night before the funeral of a deceased person when people gather in the dead man’s house to pray. During the second element of the rite, people would walk up to the deceased to check if the body was developing features of a vjesci, wupji (or opji), or wraith (ghost).

Close relatives
The wupji is a very similar legend to the vjesci. The wupji in Kashubia had two teeth instead of a cap at birth and was foreordained to become a vampire.  There was no possibility of altering its destiny. Similarly, the Nachzehrer was a vampiric legend said to begin from a child born with a caul, especially if the caul was red. This figure was also associated with epidemic sickness.

References

Vampires

Legends
Folklore
Polish folklore
Polish legends